All Wet is a 1927 animated short subject film, produced by Charles Mintz and George Winkler and directed by Walt Disney. The film was reissued in 1932 by Walter Lantz Productions with added music and sound effects, and is the only known version to survive. The short entered the public domain on January 1, 2023.

Plot
Oswald the Rabbit is selling hot dogs at the beach. However, the hot dogs have their own sentience and cause problems for those that buy them. Oswald then sees a girl he likes, Fanny, and he closes down his hot dog stand to go and impress her. She is initially unimpressed, so Oswald pays a lifeguard for his badge and dresses up as a lifeguard. Miss Rabbit decides to test Oswald's abilities as a lifeguard by rowing a boat into the ocean and calling out for help. As Oswald rows out to help her, Fanny gets attacked by a big fish. Oswald and Miss Rabbit are then shot back to shore by a wave, and Fanny is unconscious in need of resuscitation. Oswald gets her breathing again, the two kiss, and the short ends.

Legacy 
The short features Oswald selling hot dogs, the gag would be similarly re-used in the Mickey Mouse short, The Karnival Kid, in 1929. The aforementioned cartoon was the ninth Mickey cartoon released following his creation, which came after Walt Disney lost the rights to Oswald. Animation used during the sequence where Oswald rescues Miss Rabbit would later be re-purposed during Wild Waves.

Home media
The short was released on December 11, 2007 on Walt Disney Treasures: The Adventures of Oswald the Lucky Rabbit.

References

External links 
 
 

1927 films
1927 animated films
1927 short films
1927 comedy films
1920s Disney animated short films
Oswald the Lucky Rabbit cartoons
American black-and-white films
American silent short films
Films directed by Walt Disney
Animated films without speech
Silent American comedy films